This is an historical list of training ships used at SUNY Maritime College.

References

Training ships of the New York State Merchant Marine Academy
Training ships of the United States